The 1988 Stella Artois Italian Indoors was a men's professional tennis tournament played on indoor carpet courts at the Palazzo Trussardi in Milan, Italy. The event was part of the Super Series tier of the 1988 Nabisco Grand Prix. It was the 11th edition of the tournament and was played from 15 February until 21 February 1988, moved up from its usual spot in March. Fifth-seeded Yannick Noah won the singles title after his opponent in the final, Jimmy Connors, had to retire with a pulled muscle.

Finals

Singles
 Yannick Noah defeated  Jimmy Connors 4–4 ret.
 It was Noah's 1st singles title of the year and the 22nd of his career.

Doubles
 Boris Becker /  Eric Jelen defeated  Miloslav Mečíř /  Tomáš Šmíd 6–3, 6–3

References

External links
 ITF tournament edition details

Stella Artois Italian Indoors
Milan Indoor
Stella Artois Italian Indoors
Stella Artois Italian Indoors